Pseudohandelia is a genus of flowering plants in the chamomile tribe within the daisy family.

Species
The only known species is Pseudohandelia umbellifera, native to Altai Krai, Kazakhstan, Turkmenistan, Uzbekistan, Kyrgyzstan, Afghanistan, Iran, Tajikistan.

References

Flora of Asia
Monotypic Asteraceae genera
Anthemideae
Taxa named by Pierre Edmond Boissier